Dame blanche (French, "white lady") is the name used in Belgium and the Netherlands for a sweet dessert consisting of vanilla ice cream with whipped cream, and warm molten chocolate. In Germany and in Switzerland, the same type of dessert is known as a Coupe Dänemark. The dessert is similar to the American sundae. The original dish that was created by Escoffier actually consisted of almond milk ice cream, poached peach, lemon sorbet and white currants.

References

Belgian cuisine
Ice cream